DE44 may refer to:
 Delaware Route 44
 ROCS Lung Shan (DE-44), the former USS Schmitt (DE-676), transferred 1968 to Taiwan and scrapped in 1976
 , an Evarts-class destroyer escort of the United States Navy during World War II, sold for scrapping 1946